Omaha Housing Authority, or OHA, is the government agency responsible for providing public housing in Omaha, Nebraska. It is the parent organization of Housing in Omaha, Inc., a nonprofit housing developer for low-income housing.

About
OHA contracts with the United States Department of Housing and Urban Development to provide low-income people housing through rent subsidies and through 2700 public housing units and over 3700 Section 8 units.

Governance
OHA is governed by a five-member Board of Commissioners appointed by the mayor and confirmed by the Omaha City Council. Commissioners serve staggered five-year terms, setting policies governing the operations of OHA and directing current and future programs.
OHA contracts with the Department of Housing and Urban Development to provide low-income people housing through rent subsidies and through 2700 public housing units and over 4413 Section 8 units.

Properties
 Logan Fontenelle Housing Project at North 24th and Seward Streets - Demolished
 Pleasantview Homes at 1920 North 30th Street - Demolished
 Southside Terrace Garden Apartments at 5529 South 30th Street
 Spencer Apartments at 1920 North 30th Street

Housing in Omaha, Inc.
Housing in Omaha, Inc. is a non-profit affiliate corporation of the Omaha Housing Authority. HIO is a separate corporation which owns and operates its own housing units under the Section 8 New Construction program since 1979. Clifford Scott is the current Chief Executive Officer.

Properties
 Ernie Chambers Court at 4401 North 21st Street
 Bayview Apartments at 1234 South 13th Street
 Farnam Building at 1613 Farnam Street
 North Omaha Homes at 4401 North 21st Street
 Security Building at 305 South 16th Street
 Crown Creek at 4401 North 21st Street
 Benson Tower
 Highland Tower
 Jackson Tower
 Pine Tower
 Kay Jay Apartments

References

Government of Omaha, Nebraska
Affordable housing
Organizations based in Omaha, Nebraska